Sebastian Søraas Sebulonsen (born 27 January 2000) is a Norwegian professional footballer who plays as a right-back for Danish Superliga club Brøndby IF.

Career

Viking
On 12 December 2019, Sebulonsen signed a two-year contract with Eliteserien club Viking. On 21 June 2020, he made his league debut for the club in a 3–0 loss against Brann. On 11 May 2021, his contract was extended for two more years. The next day, he was loaned out to fellow Eliteserien club Mjøndalen. On 9 June 2021, Viking recalled him from his loan.

Brøndby
On 14 July 2022, Danish Superliga club Brøndby IF announced the signing of Sebulonsen on a four-year contract. He made his debut on 17 July, starting at right-back  in a 1–0 league win against AGF. His European debut came four days later in a 1–1 draw in the UEFA Europa Conference League qualifier against Pogoń Szczecin.

Career statistics

References

External links
 Profile for Viking FK

2000 births
Living people
Norwegian footballers
Norwegian expatriate footballers
Norway under-21 international footballers
Sola FK players
Viking FK players
Mjøndalen IF players
Brøndby IF players
Norwegian Third Division players
Norwegian Second Division players
Eliteserien players
Danish Superliga players
Association football fullbacks
Expatriate men's footballers in Denmark
Norwegian expatriate sportspeople in Denmark
People from Sola, Norway